Marc Lorenz (born 18 July 1988) is a German professional footballer who plays as a midfielder for Preußen Münster.

References

External links

Living people
1988 births
Sportspeople from Münster
German footballers
Footballers from North Rhine-Westphalia
Association football midfielders
FC Schalke 04 II players
SC Preußen Münster players
Sportfreunde Lotte players
Arminia Bielefeld players
SV Wehen Wiesbaden players
Karlsruher SC players
Oberliga (football) players
Regionalliga players
2. Bundesliga players
3. Liga players